The Office of the Attorney-General of Zimbabwe (AG) falls under the Ministry of Justice, Legal and Parliamentary Affairs of Zimbabwe. In November 2013, the prosecuting and government advisory roles of the Attorney-General were split under the new Constitution. The Attorney-General on that date, Johannes Tomana, became Prosecutor-General.

The Attorney-General is the chief legal advisor of the government of Zimbabwe and also sits as a member of the Senate.

History 
Ahmed Ebrahim, appointed by Prime Minister Robert Mugabe, was the first Attorney-General of Zimbabwe.

In November 2013, the position was dissolved and replaced by the Prosecutor General of Zimbabwe. In February 2015, the office of Attorney-General was revived alongside the Prosecutor-General.

List of attorneys-general

List of prosecutors-general
 Johannes Tomana, November 2013 - June 2017
 Ray Gaba (acting), June 2017 -

References

External links
 Attorney-General's office

 
Politics of Zimbabwe